Annaghmore may refer to:

Annaghmore, County Antrim, a townland in County Antrim,  Northern Ireland
Annaghmore, County Armagh, a village and townland in County Armagh, Northern Ireland
Annaghmore, County Londonderry, a townland in County Londonderry, Northern Ireland